Plesiocystiscus leonorae is a species of sea snail, a marine gastropod mollusk, in the family Cystiscidae.

Description
The length of the shell attains 1.21 mm.

Distribution
This marine species occurs off Madagascar.

References

leonorae
Gastropods described in 2010